Cyril Kali  (born 21 January 1984) is a professional footballer who plays as a defensive midfielder for Panserraikos in the Greek Professional League. Born in France, Kali represented Saint Martin national football team on four occasions.

Club career
Besançon-born Cyril Kali played in his youth years for French side AJ Auxerre and OSC Lille, while making his professional debut for Norwegian side Lillestrøm SK.

In 2006, Kali began his senior career at the Norwegian side Lillestrøm SK.
Since 2007, he has played professional football in Greece for PS Kalamata (2007), Asteras Tripolis F.C. (2007–08), Panetolikos F.C. (2008–10), Veria F.C. (thrice in 2010–11, 2012–13 and 2014–17 season) Athlitiki Enosi Larissa (2011) and Apollon Pontus F.C. in the 2017–18 season.

As a central defender, Kali has spent more than a decade in the Greek football league where he had turned out for clubs like Asteras, Tripolis and AEL. With Veria FC, he played 42 league matches and finished Runners-up in the 2011–12 Greek Football League

Indian Super League side Kerala Blasters FC have announced the signing of Cyril Kali for the 2018–19 season. He made 14 appearances and 23 interceptions for the club before moving to Panserraikos F.C. in 2019.

He has also played for Greek side PAOK FC.

Career statistics

Kerala Blasters
On 3 July 2018, Kali joined Indian Super League top division club Kerala Blasters FC.

International career
He made his debut for Saint Martin national football team on 5 September 2019 in a CONCACAF Nations League Group-A match against Barbados, as a starter. He appeared in 4 international matches for his country in 2019.

Honours

Club
Veria FC
 Football League Greece runners-up: 2011–12

See also
 List of Saint Martin international footballers

References

External links

Cyril Kali player profile at the-aiff.com

1984 births
Living people
French footballers
French expatriate footballers
Lillestrøm SK players
Kalamata F.C. players
Panserraikos F.C. players
Asteras Tripolis F.C. players
Panetolikos F.C. players
Veria F.C. players
Eliteserien players
Super League Greece players
Expatriate footballers in Norway
Expatriate footballers in Greece
French expatriate sportspeople in Norway
French expatriate sportspeople in Greece
Sportspeople from Besançon
Association football defenders
Indian Super League players
Kerala Blasters FC players
Saint Martinois footballers
Saint Martin expatriate footballers
Saint Martin international footballers
Footballers from Bourgogne-Franche-Comté
French expatriate sportspeople in India
Expatriate footballers in India
AJ Auxerre players
Lille OSC players